Martin Long may refer to:

 Martin Long (businessman) (born 1950), businessman and founder of the Churchill Insurance Company
 Martin Long (politician), Canadian politician and member of the Legislative Assembly of Alberta
 Marty Long, member of the Kansas House of Representatives